Eve Borsook (3 October 1929 – 31 August 2022) was a Canadian-born American art historian, teacher and author, specialising in murals (both wall paintings and mosaics). Her other interests included the history of glass in relation to mosaics, 16th century Florentine ceremonial decoration, and Italian cloister art.

Early life and education 
Borsook was born in Toronto, Ontario, Canada on 3 October 1929. Her parents were the English-born biochemist Henry Borsook (1897-1984) and the Austrian-born Lisl (née Hummel). Henry's hobby was art history, which may well have been an early influence on his daughter, for Eve Borsook received a BA in the History of Art from Vassar College, New York, in 1949. She went on to the Institute of Fine Arts, New York University, completing her MA in 1952 with a dissertation on the early Baroque painter Carlo Saraceni (her supervisor was the German art historian, Walter Friedlander). While pursuing her graduate studies, Borsook was also working for the Metropolitan Museum of Art. She then went on to London for her doctoral research on Italian mural painting at the Courtauld Institute of Art, University of London, where her supervisor was the art historian Johannes Wilde. At this time she also had the benefit of a Fulbright scholarship which allowed her to study in Italy. Her PhD thesis, 'Principles of mural decoration in fourteenth century Tuscan fresco cycles', completed in 1956, was published in revised form in 1960.

Professional work 
During her early days of research in Italy, Borsook made some long-term contacts which would shape her future career. In particular, she worked with a group of mural conservators in Florence led by Leonetto Tintori (1908-2000), and this relationship was to continue for more than thirty years, resulting in a number of publications. The disastrous flood in Florence in 1966 was another important milestone, which involved her in working for the CRIA (Committee to Rescue Italian Art), an American emergency aid initiative which established its headquarters at the Villa I Tatti, former home of the American art critic and connoisseur Bernard Berenson (1865–1959). From here she collaborated and liaised with many visiting conservators who had arrived in Florence to take part in the restoration work, as well as with local Florentine conservation experts and museum staff. One particularly memorable task was the retrieval and drying out of around 30,000 wet glass negatives.

Much of Borsook's later work has also taken place at the Villa I Tatti (the Harvard University Center for Italian Renaissance Studies): she was appointed research associate there (1981-1989), then senior research associate (2003-2015), and was later senior research associate emeritus. She has also taught as a visiting professor at the New York University Institute of Fine Arts, as well as other institutes in the USA, Italy and Australia. She declined a Samuel H. Kress Professorship at the National Gallery of Art in Washington DC as the fellowship would have involved a year's absence from her work in Italy.

Photographs contributed by Borsook to the Conway Library are currently being digitised by the Courtauld Institute of Art as part of the Courtauld Connects project.

In 1999 more than 20 art historians provided essays for the publication of a book titled Mosaics of friendship: studies in art and history for Eve Borsook as a 70th birthday tribute to Borsook.

Personal life and death
Borsook died on 31 August 2022, at the age of 92.

Publications

Books

Selected articles

References 

1929 births
2022 deaths
American art historians
Alumni of the Courtauld Institute of Art
Vassar College alumni
20th-century American historians
Writers from Toronto
21st-century American women writers
American people of Austrian descent
20th-century American women writers
New York University Institute of Fine Arts alumni
American people of English descent
Canadian emigrants to the United States
Canadian expatriates in England
American expatriates in England
American expatriates in Italy
Women art historians
American women historians